Andrew Yang (born 15 May 1955) was the 29th Minister of National Defense of the Republic of China, having served 1–6 August 2013. Before this, he was the Deputy Minister of National Defense from 2009 to 2013.

Education
Yang is a graduate of Fu Jen Catholic University and the London School of Economics and Political Science of the University of London. He specialized in the study of United States-Taiwan-China relations and national security. He had devoted much of his time in the research of building a cross-Taiwan Strait military mutual trust, the People's Liberation Army and regional security while teaching at universities and other academic institutions in Taiwan.

Early career
Yang had been a research associate at the Sun Yat-sen Center for Policy Studies of the National Sun Yat-sen University in Kaohsiung in 1986–2000. Yang had been the adviser for the Ministry of Foreign Affairs in 1998, Mainland Affairs Council and Ministry of National Defense since 2000. He was a lecturer at the National Sun Yat-sen University in 2000–2009.

Prior to his appointment as ROC Deputy Minister of National Defense in 2009, Yang was the Secretary-General of the China Council of Advanced Policy Studies, a Taipei-based think tank concentrating on military affairs. He also has traveled frequently to the United States where he maintains a close relationship with top officials from The Pentagon.

ROC Minister of National Defense

Ministerial post appointment
On 29 July 2013, Premier Jiang Yi-huah announced a cabinet reshuffle for the first time since he took the Premiership on 18 February 2013. Yang was appointed to be the Minister of National Defense replacing Kao Hua-chu who had earlier tendered his resignation several times due to the death scandal of Corporal Hung Chung-chiu on 4 July 2013. Right after his appointment, Yang promised that he would review military administration, professional certification and supervisory systems to improve human rights. Yang was the first civilian to head the post since Ma Ying-jeou took the Presidential office on 20 May 2008.

Resignation 
On 6 August 2013, Yang resigned from his position due to plagiarism allegations. Yang told the press that some portions of the book he had written back in 2007 were written by his friends without proper citations. He decided to resign from his post to maintain the reputation of the Executive Yuan. Deputy Minister of National Defense, Kao Kuang-chi temporarily headed the ministry on 7 August until the official ministerial appointment of Yen Ming by the Executive Yuan on 8 August 2013.

References

External links 
 

Living people
1955 births
Fu Jen Catholic University alumni 
Academic staff of the National Sun Yat-sen University
Taiwanese Ministers of National Defense
Alumni of the London School of Economics